The United Football League Cup, commonly known as UFL Cup, was a Filipino association football competition. It was played on a multistage format that culminated in a knockout stage (single elimination). Clubs eligible to compete for the cup were those who played in the United Football League. Likewise, it was open to all clubs in the Philippines that passed the requirements given by the Football Alliance Group, which organized the competition. The UFL Cup run from mid-October to mid-December and was moved from May to August starting with the 2015 edition, to make it in line with the calendar of its Southeast Asian neighbors. It provided a chance for all clubs to play each other regardless of their league divisions.

The last holders of the UFL Cup were Global, who defeated Ceres 3–1 in the 2016 final for their second title.

History
The UFL Cup was first held in October 2009 where it was known as UFL–LBC Cup, after the name of LBC Express Inc. as its title sponsor and is sanctioned by the National Capital Region Football Association (NCRFA) and the Philippine Football Federation (PFF). The purpose was to determine the distribution of clubs over the Divisions 1 and 2 of United Football League in its inaugural season. Clubs were divided into four groups of four, the top 2 finisher of each group after single round-robin elimination qualified for quarterfinals (for division one) and the bottom 2 battles for Plate Competition (for division two).  Philippine Air Force was the inaugural cup champions by defeating Philippine Army 2–1.

The 2011 UFL Cup season marks the first live television coverage of a match after AKTV (owned and operated by TV5) inked the historical 5-year multi-million peso deal with the UFL.

Cup Winners And Runners-Up

Top goal scorers by edition

Venues
Primary venues used in the 2012 UFL Cup:

References

External links
 
United Football League Philippines at Facebook.com
United Football League Philippines at Twitter.com

 
Cup
Football cup competitions in the Philippines
Recurring sporting events established in 2009
2009 establishments in the Philippines
National association football league cups
Recurring sporting events disestablished in 2016
2016 disestablishments in the Philippines
Defunct football competitions in the Philippines